Saint-Saturnin is a commune in the Cher department in the Centre-Val de Loire region of France.

Geography
The commune shares a border with the department of Indre.

Population

Sights
 The parish church of St. Saturnin dates from the twelfth century with significant restoration work in 1729 and 1929.

See also
Communes of the Cher department

References

External links

Annuaire Mairie website 
Saint-Saturnin on the Quid website 

Communes of Cher (department)